Eleanor is a novel by Mary Augusta Ward, first published in 1900.

Further reading
 Collister, Peter (1981). "Mrs Humphry Ward's Eleanor: A Late Victorian Portrait of Chateaubriand and Pauline de Beaumont," Neophilologus, Vol. 65, No. 4, pp. 622–639.
 Hamel, F. (1903). "The Scenes of Mrs Humphry Ward's Novels," The Bookman, Vol. 18, pp. 144–151.
 Sutton-Ramspeck, Beth (1987). "The Slayer and the Slain: Women and Sacrifice in Mary Ward's 'Eleanor'," South Atlantic Review, Vol. 52, No. 4, pp. 39–60.

External links
 Eleanor, at Internet Archive
 Eleanor, at Project Gutenberg

1900 British novels
Novels by Mary Augusta Ward